Mihály Gyulai (born 2 November 1953) is a Hungarian wrestler. He competed in the men's freestyle 48 kg at the 1976 Summer Olympics.

References

1953 births
Living people
Hungarian male sport wrestlers
Olympic wrestlers of Hungary
Wrestlers at the 1976 Summer Olympics
Sport wrestlers from Budapest